HD 73534 is an 8th magnitude G-type subgiant star located approximately 272 light years away in the constellation Cancer. A G5 star, it has evolved off the main sequence, which is why it is much more luminous than the Sun. In August 2009, it was announced that it has a planet. It is the first planetary system discovered in Cancer since that of 55 Cancri in April 1996, and the sixth planet, as 55 Cancri has five known planets.

The star HD 73534 is named Gakyid. The name was selected by Bhutan as part of the NameExoWorlds campaigns during the 100th anniversary of the IAU. Gakyid means happiness.

See also
 HD 179079
 List of extrasolar planets

References

G-type subgiants
Planetary systems with one confirmed planet
Cancer (constellation)
Durchmusterung objects
073534
042446